Linda Garden (born 17 October 1955) is an Australian athlete. She competed in the women's long jump at the 1984 Summer Olympics.

References

1955 births
Living people
Athletes (track and field) at the 1984 Summer Olympics
Australian female long jumpers
Olympic athletes of Australia
Place of birth missing (living people)